Guy Lorin Reschenthaler (born April 17, 1983) is an American politician, attorney, judge, and U.S. Navy veteran. He served as a district judge and in the U.S. Navy Judge Advocate General's Corps (JAG) during the Iraq War. He is serving as the Republican Chief Deputy Whip in the 118th Congress.

Early life and education

Reschenthaler was born in Pittsburgh on April 17, 1983. He was raised in Pittsburgh's South Hills and graduated from Thomas Jefferson High School in 2001. He graduated from Penn State Erie, The Behrend College in 2004 with a BA in political science. Upon graduation, Reschenthaler attended Duquesne University School of Law in Pittsburgh, earning a JD in 2007. At Duquesne, Reschenthaler founded the Military Law Society chapter and interned at the U.S. District Attorney's Office for the Western District of Pennsylvania in Pittsburgh.

Military career 

After law school, Reschenthaler served in the United States Navy Judge Advocate General's Corps (JAG) in Iraq. In the U.S. Navy, Reschenthaler deployed to Baghdad, Iraq, in 2009. In 2010, he was one of three attorneys who defended a Navy SEAL accused of covering up an assault on terrorist Ahmad Hashim Abd al-Isawi while al-Isawi was in custody. The Navy SEAL represented by Reschenthaler and the other SEALs charged were acquitted of all charges. Reschenthaler was awarded the Michael Taylor Shelby Award for Professional, Ethics and Dedication in the practice of law. He left military service in 2012.

Legal career 

After his Navy service, Reschenthaler returned to Pittsburgh to practice law in spring 2012 before being elected magisterial district judge in Pittsburgh's South Hills in 2013. In Pennsylvania, magisterial judges typically handle traffic tickets. He was elected district judge in May 2013. As a magistrate, Reschenthaler claimed that he would seek to reduce truancy.

In 2013, Reschenthaler briefly co-hosted a radio program with Carl Higbie, who resigned from the Trump administration in 2018 after what were considered "anti-gay, anti-Muslim, racist and sexist remarks he had made on his radio program". He also wrote the foreword to Higbie's self-published 2012 book, which CNN reported had racist, homophobic, and xenophobic content. In April 2018, Reschenthaler denounced the book, disavowed the foreword he had written, and said he should not have written it. Though Higbie's book was a frequent topic of discussion on the radio show that Reschenthaler co-hosted, Reschenthaler said he had read only parts of it.

Reschenthaler was of counsel at Pittsburgh law firm Brennan, Robins & Daley and serves as a member of Penn State Behrend's Political Science Advisory Board.

Pennsylvania Senate 

After State Senator Matt Smith resigned, Reschenthaler won the Republican nomination for a special election in the 37th state Senate district in July 2015. He defeated the Democratic nominee, Heather Arnet, in the general election to serve the remainder of Smith's term, ending in 2016. He was sworn in on November 24, 2015.

U.S. House of Representatives

Elections

2018 special 

In October 2017, Reschenthaler his candidacy for the Republican nomination in the special election in Pennsylvania's 18th congressional district. At the Republican Party conference, he lost to State Representative Rick Saccone. He received 75 votes from local activists and failed to gain a majority in the first round of voting. He was defeated by 32 votes in the second round.

2018 general 

After a court threw out Pennsylvania's congressional map as an unconstitutional partisan gerrymander, the 18th district was renumbered the 14th and made even more Republican on paper. Democrat Conor Lamb defeated Saccone in the special election for the old 18th, but had his home drawn into the neighboring 17th district (the former 12th district) and sought a full term there.

Reschenthaler ran in the Republican primary for the reconfigured 14th, again facing Saccone. This time, he won the nomination with 55.4% of the vote to Saccone's 44.6%. In the general election, he defeated the Democratic nominee, businesswoman Bibiana Boerio, with 58% of the vote.

2020 

Reschenthaler ran for reelection. He defeated the Democratic nominee, U.S. Marine Corps veteran William Marx, with 64.7% of the vote.

On December 31, 2020, Reschenthaler and seven other Republican U.S. representatives from Pennsylvania said they would oppose the certification of Pennsylvania’s electors when Congress met to count electoral votes in the 2020 presidential election on January 6, 2021. The eight claimed that state officials had illegally allowed the counting of mail-in ballots that were received after Election Day but postmarked by November 3. According to NBC Philadelphia news and the Pennsylvania Capital-Star, this was not proven.

Reschentaler was also among those who signed an amicus brief to a lawsuit filed by Texas's attorney general seeking to throw out federal election results in key swing states, including Pennsylvania.

Reschenthaler, who represents the southwest corner of Pennsylvania, was one of 147 Republican representatives and senators to vote against certifying the presidential election results.

Tenure
In December 2020, Reschenthaler joined other Republicans in voting against providing $2,000 stimulus checks to Americans, on grounds that such aid would further weaken the US economy.

Committee assignments 
 Committee on Appropriations
 Subcommittee on the Energy and Water Development
 Subcommittee on State, Foreign Operations, and Related Programs
 Committee on Rules 
 Subcommittee on Rules and Organization of Congress
 Select Committee on the Modernization of Congress

Caucus memberships 
 Republican Study Committee
Republican Main Street Partnership

Electoral history 

2018

2020

References

External links 
 Congressman Guy Reschenthaler official U.S. House website
 Campaign website
 
 
 

|-

|-

|-

1983 births
Living people
21st-century American lawyers
21st-century American judges
21st-century American politicians
United States Navy personnel of the Iraq War
Duquesne University School of Law alumni
Pennsylvania district justices
Pennsylvania lawyers
Republican Party Pennsylvania state senators
Pennsylvania State University alumni
Republican Party members of the United States House of Representatives from Pennsylvania
United States Navy officers